The Colombia national korfball team represents Colombia in korfball international competitions.

Tournament history

References

National sports teams of Colombia
National korfball teams
Korfball in Colombia